Aleksandra Zajączek (1754 - 1845), was a Polish noblewoman. She was the spouse of Józef Zajączek, Viceroy of Poland in 1815-26. She was known for her beauty, and for the treatments she recommended in order to keep it.

References 

 Jadwiga Nadzieja: Generał Józef Zajączek. Warszawa: 1979.

1754 births
1845 deaths
19th-century Polish people